The Hawaii International Conference on System Sciences (HICSS) is an annual conference for Information Systems and Information Technology academics and professionals sponsored by the University of Hawaii at Manoa. The conference provides a platform for panel discussions and the presentation of peer-reviewed information systems research papers.

The first HICSS conference took place in 1968 at the University of Hawaii. From 1968 to 1989, HICSS proceedings were published by Western Periodicals Company, California. As the conference grew, HICSS worked with the IEEE Computer Society for its proceedings. Starting in 2017, all HICSS publications have been archived and disseminated at no cost to all readers worldwide through ScholarSpace. They have also been made available in the digital library of the Association for Information Systems (AIS).

According to Microsoft Academic in 2021, in terms of citations, HICSS has ranked first among information systems as well as business conferences and overall, ranked 37th among all conferences indexed by Microsoft Academic. HICSS H-Index reported by SCImago Journal Rank in 2022 was 92, significantly higher than the average H-Index reported in the same year for information systems journals and comparable with top Information Systems journals (e.g., compared with Information Systems Journal with H-Index of 94).

HICSS Conferences
Past and future HICSS conferences include:

References

External links
Hawaii International Conference on System Sciences
University of Hawai'i at Manoa, Shidler College of Business
Shidler College of Business, Information Technology Management Department
HICSS Conference Organization

Information systems conferences
Recurring events established in 1968
1968 establishments in Hawaii
Academic conferences